Colletotrichum somersetense is a morphologically cryptic species described by J.A Crouch in 2014. This species belongs to Colletotrichum caudatum sensu lato and is a pathogen on warm-season grasses (Sorghastrum nutans). Presence of a unique filiform appendage at the apex of the conidium is the distinctive morphological character.

References 

Phyllachorales
Fungi described in 2014